Modern Jazz Perspective is an album by American jazz trumpeter Donald Byrd and saxophonist Gigi Gryce, with featured vocalist Jackie Paris, recorded in 1957 for the Columbia label.

Reception

Track listing
All compositions by Gigi Gryce except as indicated
 "Medley: Early Morning Blues (Cy Coleman, Joseph McCarthy)/ Now, Don't You Know" (Gryce, as "Lee Sears")- 3:45  
 "Early Bird" (Donald Byrd) - 7:31  
 "Elgy" (Byrd) - 6:28    
 "Stablemates" (Benny Golson) - 4:59    
 "Steppin' Out" - 5:30    
 "Social Call" - 4:43    
 "An Evening in Casablanca" - 5:05    
 "Satellite" - 4:26   
Recorded in New York City on August 30, 1957 (tracks 6-8), September 3, 1957 (tracks 1-3), and September 5, 1957 (tracks 4 & 5)

Personnel 
Gigi Gryce – alto saxophone 
Donald Byrd – trumpet  
Jimmy Cleveland – trombone (tracks 4 & 5) 
Julius Watkins – French horn (tracks 4 & 5)
Sahib Shihab – baritone saxophone (tracks 4 & 5)
Wynton Kelly – piano
Wendell Marshall – bass
Art Taylor – drums
Jackie Paris – banjo (track 1), vocals (tracks 1-3)
 S. Neil Fujita – cover artwork

References 

1957 albums
Gigi Gryce albums
Donald Byrd albums
Columbia Records albums
Album covers by S. Neil Fujita